Venosa Cathedral is a Roman Catholic cathedral in Venosa, Basilicata, Italy, dedicated to Saint Andrew. It was constructed 1470 and 1502. Formerly the episcopal seat of the Diocese of Venosa, since 1986 it has been a co-cathedral in the Diocese of Melfi-Rapolla-Venosa.

References

Roman Catholic cathedrals in Italy
Cathedrals in Basilicata
Romanesque architecture in Italy
Churches in the province of Potenza